Syarhey Melnik (born 5 July 1995) is a Belarusian professional footballer who plays for Rogachev.

References

External links
 
 

1995 births
Living people
Belarusian footballers
Association football midfielders
FC Minsk players
FC Vitebsk players
FC Baranovichi players
FC Smorgon players
FC Granit Mikashevichi players
FC Chist players
FC Arsenal Dzerzhinsk players
FC Oshmyany players
FC Naftan Novopolotsk players
FC Dnepr Rogachev players